Franklin Patrick Spring (born October 19, 1949) is a Canadian former professional ice hockey player who played 61 games in the National Hockey League (NHL) and 13 games in the World Hockey Association (WHA). He was born in Rossland, British Columbia and raised in Cranbrook, British Columbia. He played with the St. Louis Blues, Boston Bruins, California Golden Seals, Cleveland Barons, and Indianapolis Racers.

Family
Spring's father, Frank Spring Sr., owned a car dealership in Cranbrook and served as president of the British Columbia Amateur Hockey Association. Spring's brother, Danny Spring played in the WHA for the Winnipeg Jets and Edmonton Oilers. Spring's son Corey Spring played in the NHL for the Tampa Bay Lightning in the late 1990s.

Career statistics
Career playing statistics:

References

1949 births
Living people
Boston Bruins draft picks
Boston Bruins players
California Golden Seals players
Canadian ice hockey right wingers
Cleveland Barons (NHL) players
Denver Spurs players
Denver Spurs (WHL) players
Edmonton Oil Kings (WCHL) players
Hershey Bears players
Ice hockey people from British Columbia
Indianapolis Racers players
National Hockey League first-round draft picks
New Haven Nighthawks players
Sportspeople from Cranbrook, British Columbia
Oklahoma City Blazers (1965–1977) players
People from Rossland, British Columbia
Richmond Robins players
Salt Lake Golden Eagles (CHL) players
St. Louis Blues players